is a Japanese manga series written and illustrated by Katsu Aki. It has been serialized in Young Animal since 1997, with the chapters later combined into tankōbon volumes by Hakusensha, of which there are eighty-eight as of January 2023. The series follows a newlywed couple in their mid-twenties, both virgins when they married, and chronicles their sexual explorations. The manga combines erotic elements with factual and informative statistics. Its title Futari Ecchi ("two person ecchi") is a play on a slang term for masturbation, hitori ecchi ("single person ecchi"). The series has 29.5 million copies in print and is most famous for being a how-to guide combined with a story.

Two spin-off manga have been released, Futari Ecchi for Ladies focusing on the sexuality of women and Futari Ecchi Gaiden: Akira, The Evangelist of Sex focusing on Akira. There are also two sex manuals and an art book. The series was adapted into a three episode live-action television drama that aired on WOWOW in 2000. A four-volume original video animation (OVA) series was produced from 2002 and 2004. In 2011, a twelve-episode live-action web series was streamed on Ustream. Also in 2011, a live-action theatrical film series began. Four films have been released. A second three episode OVA series was released in 2014 by Production Reed.

In 2007, the manga series was licensed in North America by Tokyopop as Manga Sutra, only four volumes were released, comprising eight Japanese volumes. Also in 2007, Media Blasters licensed and released the OVAs on DVD as Step Up Love Story.

Characters

The series' protagonist, a 25-year-old foreign cosmetics maker and elite salaryman. He was introduced to Yura through an omiai. He is very critical of his own sexual abilities, but that does not hinder him from having sexual fantasies with any pretty girl in his vicinity (ultimately, though, he stays faithful to Yura). Nevertheless, after his marriage he attracts the attention of a lot of female admirers. In addition to his inexperience, Makoto suffers from premature ejaculation.

He is voiced by Mitsuo Iwata (radio drama) and Yūji Ueda (2002 OVA), Yuichi Nakamura (2014 OVA) and portrayed by Sō Yamanaka (TV series), Shinnosuke Fukushima (web series), Riki Miura (1st film) and Hikaru Okada (2nd film).

Makoto's wife. Also 25 years old. Makoto is the first man she has ever kissed or had sex with. She is loving, but extremely naïve on sexual matters and too shy to try something new by herself (even through the series she is fully determined to overcome her limitations and be a better lover to Makoto), as well as insecure about her looks; she is unaware how beautiful and charming she is. She is also the target of attention by many men (although their behavior is – compared to the women who adore her husband – mostly passive longing). She additionally has the knack of befriending most of the women whom she should consider her rivals for Makoto's affections (Makoto's colleague Makie Sugiyama is a notable exception). Yura is also a big fan of undead-themed horror movies. When she was in high school, she was a member of the Tennis club.

She is voiced by Yumi Ichihara (radio drama) and Tomoko Kawakami (2002 OVA), Ayumi Tsunematsu (2014 OVA) and portrayed by Chika Inada (TV series), Nana Nanaumi (web series) and Yūri Morishita (films).

Yura's 20-year-old sister. Sexually experienced and rather promiscuous (to the point where, early in the series, she keeps a boyfriend and three "sex friends" – in addition to miscellaneous flings), she constantly teases and goads both Makoto and Yura into improving their "night life". At first in an on-and-off relationship with her "number-one boyfriend", Taku Yamada, for most of the series, she eventually decides to settle down, even marrying the son of Makoto's boss Katori, though their matrimony rapidly disintegrates soon afterwards following personal differences.

She is voiced by Fumie Kusachi (radio drama) and Naoko Takano (2002 OVA), Chiwa Saitō (2014 OVA) and portrayed by Ayaka Tomoda (web series) and Miyuki Yokoyama (films).

Makoto's older brother. A 29-year-old lawyer. He is very nosy and frequently pesters Makoto about his sex life and fancies himself as Makoto's tutor on the topic of pleasuring the wife. In order to appease his own sex drive, he frequently visits brothels.

He is portrayed by Yuichi Tsuchiya (3rd film).

Makoto's 17-year-old sister. Initially she has a rather romantic look on a relationship, and her quest for true love lets her drift through a number of affairs before she finally finds happiness with her first boyfriend, Yosuke.

She is portrayed by Natsumi Kamata (web series) and Kirara Asuka (2nd film).

Makoto's sister-in-law and Akira's 27-year-old wife. She is annoyed at Akira's habit of patronizing brothels.

She is portrayed by Sasa Handa (web series) and Rika Kawamura (3rd film).

Makoto's father. A 52-year-old company officer. He is overly sensitive about his sex life, and far too protective of his youngest child, Jun.

He is portrayed by Bengaru (3rd film).

Makoto's mother. A 54-year-old housewife. Akiko proves to be more liberal (and encouraging) than her husband is when it comes to the topic of her sex life.

She is portrayed by Motoko Sasaki (3rd film).

Yura's father. A 49-year-old camera operator. He has a liking for cats and dogs, and raises a large number of them. He is also a fan of the Hanshin Tigers. While not as active as his daughters, he still enjoys a fulfilling sexual relationship with his wife Chiharu.

He is voiced by Ken Mizukoshi (2014 OVA).

Yura's mother. A 47-year-old with a youthful appearance and a tender personality. Like her husband, she is a cat/dog aficionado. She frequently suffers from lumbago.

She is voiced by Aina Yasukuni (2014 OVA).

Makoto's second cousin and an obstetrician and gynecologist. At the request of Makoto's mother, she moved in next door to the Onodas to encourage them to reproduce. A very dominant personality, she was still a virgin at age thirty, but she finally does get settled down with Koichiro Matsuzaki.

She is portrayed by Momoko Tani (3rd film).

 
Rika's "number-one boyfriend", who is a rather self-centered sexist. And just like Rika, he is not very concerned about having more than one relationship, although he does react jealously when he finds her involved with other men. Eventually, however, Rika dumps him, settles down, divorces and rekindles their relationship.

He is voiced by Kappei Yamaguchi (2002 OVA) and portrayed by Yukio (web series).

Jun's first and current boyfriend; also her former classmate and now fellow student. Jun had her first time with him, but due to their then differing views of a relationship they broke apart for a couple of years before finding each other again. They have since moved together and are exploring (and deepening) their feelings for each other.

He is portrayed by Rakuto Tochihara (web series).

Style and theme
There are many scenes in the series that look like they are actually happening but are then revealed to be the sexual fantasies of Makoto or another character. This means there are many scenes of Makoto having sex with other characters, while in truth he only has sex with Yura.

One of the fetishes explored in the series is cosplay.

Though most of the early chapters focus on Makoto and Yura's relationship, it later deviates to other characters' love/sex lives, covering more events to teach the readers with.

Media

Manga

Written and illustrated by Katsu Aki, Futari Ecchi has been serialized biweekly in Young Animal since January 1997. The chapters are later combined into tankōbon volumes by Hakusensha, of which there are eighty-eight as of January 2023. In December 2002, a side story called  began serialization in Silky, running for twelve chapters until its conclusion in October 2004. It focused on the women in the series, the individual chapters were collected and published into two tankōbon volumes by Hakusensha. Another side story titled  began in Young Animal on June 23, 2017 and ended on November 24, 2017. It commemorates the series' 20th anniversary and is written by Monkey Chop and supervised by Katsu. It was compiled into one volume. There are also two sex manuals and an art book, entitled Yura Yura.

Tokyopop licensed Futari Ecchi for an English-language release in North America under the name Manga Sutra - Futari H in 2007, with two volumes of the original Japanese release combined into a single volume. However, before the release of the first volume, which was published in January 2008, several major retailers had announced they would not carry the title due to its content. A representative of Tokyopop also said that the volumes were expensive to produce. They planned to release the first 10 Japanese tankōbon in five volumes, but only four were released, the fourth published in January 2009. Tokyopop ceased all manga publications in 2011. The manga has also received domestic releases in Germany (as Manga Love Story), France, Poland, Spain, Brazil, Italy and Taiwan, by Carlsen Comics, Pika Édition, Waneko, Mangaline Comics, Editora JBC, Dynit and Ching Win Publishing respectively.

Radio drama
From January 5 to March 30, 1997 a radio drama was broadcast on Nippon Cultural Broadcasting.

Original video animations
Beginning in 2002, a four-volume original video animation series was produced by Chaos Project. It is split into two stages; the first two episodes, released on July 26 and September 7, 2002, make up one, and the last two, released on November 27, 2003 and January 22, 2004, make up the second.

On July 2, 2007, Media Blasters announced that they had licensed the OVA series at Anime Expo. They first released it as Step Up Love Story on two DVDs, each containing two episodes, on November 27, 2007 and January 29, 2008. On December 30, 2008 it was released in a box set, which was re-released on July 10, 2012 as part of their Anime Works Classic line.

Another three episode OVA, telling an original story, was released on October 10, 2014 by Production Reed.

Live-action
A three-part live-action mini-series adaptation of Futari Ecchi aired on the Pay-per-view channel WOWOW in 2000.

The June 2011 issue of Young Animal Arashi announced Futari Ecchi would be receiving both a live-action film adaptation and a live-action web series.

The web series was streamed on Ustream and stars Nana Nanaumi and Shinnosuke Fukushima as Yura and Makoto with Takaso Kase as Akira Onoda and Sasa Handa as Sanae Onoda. It premiered in July 2011 and had fifteen 12-minute episodes created. The entire series was released in DVD and Blu-ray box sets on September 16, 2011, with three additional episodes and a bonus DVD with a making-of feature.

The film stars Yūri Morishita and Riki Miura as Yura and Makoto, was directed by Kazuhiro Yokoyama and written by Juri Sanemura. The first film was released on June 18, 2011 and received a DVD release on September 2. At an event for the DVD release, a sequel called  was announced to begin filming in October. Hikaru Okada replaces Miura as Makoto in the sequel, which hit theaters on December 17, 2011.

Just like previously, a third film was announced at the second's DVD release party. They were released on DVD on June 15 and August 3 respectively.

Reception
The Futari Ecchi manga has 29.5 million collected volumes in print as of February 2018; 27 million in Japan, including digital copies, and 2.5 million overseas.

Further reading

References

External links
  
 Official live-action web series website  
  
 Anime News Network review of OVA

 

1997 manga
2000 Japanese television series debuts
2000 Japanese television series endings
2002 anime OVAs
2002 manga
Anime Works
Ashi Productions
Erotic romance anime and manga
Films directed by Kazuhiro Yokoyama
Hakusensha franchises
Hakusensha manga
Josei manga
Live-action films based on manga
Marriage in anime and manga
Romantic comedy anime and manga
Seinen manga
Sex comedy anime and manga
Sexuality in anime and manga
Tokyopop titles
Wowow original programming
Japanese romantic comedy films
Japanese sex comedy films